L'Aviation Militaire (lit. "Military Aviation") was a book written by the French inventor Clément Ader and published in 1909 by the Paris publisher Berger-Levrault. The book was essentially based on ideas developed by Ader at the end of the 19th century, which were arranged in final form in 1907. It was hugely popular, and went through 10 editions in the five years between its publication and the First World War.

L'Aviation Militaire is especially famous for its precise description of the concept of the modern aircraft carrier with a flat flight deck, an island superstructure, deck elevators and a hangar bay.

On the structure of the aircraft carrier:

On stowage:

On the technique of landing:

The book received much attention, and the US naval attaché in Paris sent a report on his observations, before actual experiments took place in the United States a year later

L'Aviation Militaire was translated into English in 2003 by Lee Kennett for the Air University Press, under the title Military Aviation.

References

Bibliography

Aerial warfare
Aviation books
1909 books
French non-fiction books